Disch Promontory is a high, ice-covered promontory,  long, extending from the east side of Prince Andrew Plateau, Queen Elizabeth Range. It was named by the Advisory Committee on Antarctic Names for Carl R. Disch, a United States Antarctic Research Program ionospheric physicist, who was lost at Byrd Station, May 8, 1965.

References 

Promontories of Antarctica
Landforms of the Ross Dependency
Shackleton Coast